Storck may refer to:

 August Storck, German sweets producer
 Storck Barracks, a US Army facility in Germany
 Storck, Virginia, an unincorporated community

People
 Abraham Storck (1644-1708), Dutch painter
 Anton von Störck (1731-1803), Austrian physician
 Bernd Storck (born 1963), German head coach of the Hungarian national football team and former football player
 Carl Storck (1892-1950), co-founder of the National Football League and a founding team owner
 Carol Storck (1854-1926), Romanian sculptor 
 Cecilia Cuțescu-Storck (1879-1969), Romanian painter
 Erik Storck, American sailor in the 2012 Olympics
 Frederic Storck (1872-1942), Romanian sculptor 
 Georg Störck (1911-2011), German World War II Wehrmacht officer
 George H. Storck, American college football coach in the 1960s
 Gunther Storck (1938-1993), German Catholic bishop
 Henri Storck (1907–1999), Belgian author and filmmaker
 Hermann Baagøe Storck (1839-1922), Danish architect
 Jacobus Storck (1641-c. 1700), Dutch painter
 Karl Storck (1826-1887), Romanian sculptor and art theorist
 Klaus Storck (1928–2011), German cellist, music editor and academic teacher 
 Shelby Storck (1916-1969), American newscaster, actor, writer, journalist, public relations specialist and film and television producer and director

See also
Storch (disambiguation)
Stork (disambiguation)